St Clere, St. Clere and Saint Clere are variants of the name Sinclair, notably found in Essex, England. They are the names of numerous people and things, among them:

St Clere (family), a noble family from Danbury, Essex
St Clere's School, Stanford-le-Hope, Essex
Saint Clere, Kansas
St. Clere Township, Pottawatomie County, Kansas
St Clere, Kent, England
George John St Clere Gage, 7th Viscount Gage 
Collet of St. Clere, Kent, an extinct English baronetcy
Sir Thomas St Clere, a 15th-century English landholder

See also
Saint Clair (disambiguation)
Sinclair (disambiguation)